The V class is a series of 7 container ships built for Maersk Line. They were the largest container ships with ice class 1A when they were built. The ships were built by COSCO Zhoushan Shipyard in China and have a maximum theoretical capacity of around 3,600 twenty-foot equivalent units (TEU).

List of ships

See also 

 Maersk Triple E-class container ship
 Maersk E-class container ship
 Maersk H-class container ship
 Maersk Edinburgh-class container ship
 Gudrun Maersk-class container ship
 Maersk M-class container ship
 Maersk C-class container ship

References 

Container ship classes
Ships of the Maersk Line